This is a list of the National Register of Historic Places listings in Kenedy County, Texas.

This is intended to be a complete list of properties and districts listed on the National Register of Historic Places in Kenedy County, Texas. There are two districts listed on the National Register in the county including one which is a National Historic Landmark.

Current listings

The publicly disclosed locations of National Register properties and districts may be seen in a mapping service provided.

|}

See also

National Register of Historic Places listings in Texas
List of National Historic Landmarks in Texas
Recorded Texas Historic Landmarks in Kenedy County

References

External links

Kenedy County, Texas
Kenedy County
Buildings and structures in Kenedy County, Texas